Montreal Park is a development in Sevenoaks in Kent which was formerly the home of Lord Amherst, Commander-in-Chief of the Forces. It was named after his conquest of Montreal in 1760.

History
In 1764 Lord Amherst returned home after his military successes during the Seven Years' War and commissioned a large house at Sevenoaks in Kent built in the Palladian style. On 30 August 1788 he was created, additional to his other title of Holmesdale, Baron Amherst of Montreal.

In 1926 the house was sold to Julius Runge, a businessman, who allowed it to fall into disrepair. The house was demolished in 1936 and replaced between 1952 and 1963 by a housing development promoted by a local builder, William Fasey.  Montreal Park Lake is owned by the Holmesdale Angling and Conservation Society.

Today all that remains to remind us of Lord Amherst is an octagonal gatehouse, a derelict stone summerhouse and large obelisk.

The obelisk
The inscription on the obelisk reads:

References

External links 

 Kate Smith, A Collaborative Endeavour: Building House, Home and Family at Montreal Park in Kent, University College London.

Sevenoaks
British country houses destroyed in the 20th century
Buildings and structures in Kent